Charles Henry Wyndham, 3rd Baron Leconfield,  (17 February 1872 – 16 April 1952) was a British peer, army officer and political figure. He succeeded his father as third Baron Leconfield in 1901.

Ancestry

Wyndham was born at the family estate, Petworth House, in Sussex. A direct descendant of Sir John Wyndham, he was the second but eldest surviving son of Henry Wyndham, 2nd Baron Leconfield, and Constance Evelyn Primrose, daughter of Archibald Primrose, Lord Dalmeny. His grandfather, the first Baron Leconfield, was the adopted heir of George Wyndham, 3rd Earl of Egremont, from whom the family derived their considerable wealth.

Military career

He served in the 1st Life Guards from 1892 to 1898 and He was appointed a lieutenant of the Reserve on 27 January 1900,. In 1901, during the Second Boer War, he became the commanding officer of the newly-reformed Sussex Yeomanry (originally raised at Petworth by the 3rd Earl of Egremont). Wyndham served and was wounded during the Second Boer War in 1900.

During World War I he rejoined the 1st Life Guards and commanded the Royal Sussex Volunteers from 1917 to 1918. In World War II, he was appointed Honorary Colonel of the 5th Battalion of the Border Regiment (representing Cumberland, of which he held significant lands), and of the 98th Surrey and Sussex Yeomanry. He served as Lord Lieutenant of Sussex between 1917 and 1949.

Properties
Lord Leconfield inherited the family seat, Petworth House, as well as significant land in Cumberland, including Cockermouth Castle and Scafell Pike. In 1919, he placed Scafell Pike—the highest peak in England—under the custody of the National Trust in honour of the soldiers of the Lake District who served in World War I.

Lord Leconfield also opened the state rooms and large art collection of Petworth House, his 17th-century mansion, to the public. In 1947, he gave The house and its 735-acre park to the National Trust.

Later life

Lord Leconfield married Beatrice Violet Rawson, daughter of Colonel Richard Hamilton Rawson, in 1911. Wyndham had two adopted children, Peter and Elizabeth Geraldine Wyndham (born Betty Seymour).

He was a dedicated sportsman, a master of foxhounds, and served as president of the Marylebone Cricket Club for the 1927–1928 season. He also served as president of the Pratt's club in London.

He died in April 1952, aged 80, after a lengthy illness. Wyndham was succeeded in the barony by his younger brother Hugh (1877–1963) as his adopted son Peter was disqualified from inheriting his adoptive father’s titles and estates. Wyndham left an estate of £2,136,439.

His adopted daughter Elizabeth Wyndham was a socialite and civil servant, born on 15 December 1922. She died on 13 May 2008, aged 85 in Chalfont St Giles, Buckinghamshire. As an accomplished polyglot, during the Second World War, she worked as a linguist in the British codebreaking department at Bletchley Park.

References

Book source

1872 births
1952 deaths
Barons in the Peerage of the United Kingdom
Leconfield
Deputy Lieutenants of Sussex
Knights Grand Cross of the Royal Victorian Order
Lord-Lieutenants of Sussex
Masters of foxhounds in England
Presidents of the Marylebone Cricket Club
Leconfield
Leconfield
Charles
Younger sons of barons